Hsu Yung Chin (Traditional Chinese: 徐永進; 13 November 1951 – 26 October 2022) was a Taiwanese artist and calligrapher. Originally known for traditional Chinese calligraphy, in the 1990s he began to gain renown for his postmodernist calligraphy and ink paintings.

Biography 
Hsu was born in Miaoli, Taiwan. His parents were farmers and his father also worked as a construction worker. At the age of 22, he graduated from Hsinchu Teacher's College. After working as an elementary school teacher for several years, he returned to university and got a degree in Chinese Literature from Shida University. After graduation, he worked as a secretary for the dean of Ming Chuan University for three years before becoming an artist full-time. He was married to Zheng Fang He, a widely published art critic.

Hsu died on 26 October 2022, at the age of 70.

Notable Exhibitions 
1981 Group Calligraphy Exhibition, National Museum of History, Taipei, Taiwan
1989 Solo Calligraphy Exhibition, Taipei Fine Arts Museum, Taipei, Taiwan
1989 Solo Ink Painting Exhibition, National Taiwan Museum of Fine Arts, Taichung, Taiwan
1993 The Beauty of Taiwan, Taipei Fine Arts Museum, Taipei, Taiwan
1998 The Nudes, Taichung City Cultural Center, Taichung, Taiwan
2005 International Contemporary Calligraphy Exhibition, China Academy of Art, Hangzhou, China
2007 International Contemporary Calligraphy Exhibition, Taipei Fine Arts Museum, Taipei, Taiwan
2009 Busan Calligraphy Biennale Exhibition (Co-exhibition), Busan Museum of Modern Art, Busan, Korea
2010 Praying Words (Co-exhibition), World Expo 2010, Shanghai, China
2011 Beyond Calligraphy,  Museum of Contemporary Art, Taipei, Taiwan
2014 The Flow of Ink, Art Stage Singapore, Singapore
2015 Eastern Tao, Solo Calligraphy Exhibition, A.Rome Gallery, Rome, Italy
2015 Beyond Visuality, Art Taipei, Taipei, Taiwan
2016 ART CENTRAL, Hong Kong, China
2016 Solo Calligraphy Exhibition, Taipei Economic and Cultural Representative Office in Japan, Tokyo, Japan
2016 An Infinite Progression , Art Taipei, Taipei, Taiwan
2017 I Nature, Art Taipei, Taipei, Taiwan
2017 I Nature, Ink Asia, Hong Kong
2019 Flowing Fragrance Upon Calligraphy, INK NOW Art Expo, Taipei, Taiwan
2019 Contemporary Calligraphy, Seattle Art Fair, Seattle, United States

Awards 

In 1976, when Hsu was  26 years old, he won first prize for calligraphy at Taiwan's 30th annual National Art Competition.  Before giving up competition in 1978, he had won six other national calligraphy competitions.

Postmodern Chinese Calligraphy 

Hsu Yung Chin's calligraphy has been described as modern and postmodern, because it breaks with traditional calligraphy's rules regarding form, color, materials, and subject matter in order to create a more visceral and contemporary aesthetic. Hsu turned away from traditional calligraphy because he felt it was too steeped in conservatism to be relevant to contemporary Chinese society. While the content and aesthetic of Hsu's works are postmodern, he maintains the traditional relationship between calligraphy and Zen practice, focusing on the act of painting as opposed to the work that is created

References

External links
English blog

1951 births
2022 deaths
Taiwanese artists
Taiwanese calligraphers
Taiwanese people of Hakka descent
People from Miaoli County